Geshniz Jan (also Romanized as Geshnīz Jān; also known as Geshnīgān, Geshnīzgān, Gīshnegūn, Kashnegūn, and Kashnīgān) is a village in Kabutarsorkh Rural District, in the Central District of Chadegan County, Isfahan Province, Iran. At the 2006 census, its population was 2,299, in 540 families.

References 

Populated places in Chadegan County